Vinci is a 2004 Polish comedy heist film written, directed, and produced by Juliusz Machulski.

Plot 
Cuma (Robert Więckiewicz), an art thief, is commissioned to steal Lady with an Ermine by Leonardo da Vinci, which has been returned from Japan to the Czartoryski Museum in Kraków. Cuma asks his friend Julian (Borys Szyc), a former colleague, for help.

Julian goes along with Cuma's plans for the theft, but meanwhile plots to switch the painting for a reproduction, so that the precious original will not be not lost. He consults old forger Hagen (Jan Machulski), who assigns the task of making a copy to the talented student Magda (Kamila Baar).

Cast 
 Robert Więckiewicz as Robert "Cuma" Cumiński
 Borys Szyc as Julian "Szerszeń" Wolniewicz
 Mieczysław Grąbka as fence Mieczysław "Gruby"
 Marcin Dorociński as police commissioner Łukasz Wilk
 Kamilla Baar as Magda
 Jacek Król as Werbus
 Jan Machulski as Tadeusz Hagen

Filming 
Principal photography began April 14, 2004 in Warsaw, and ended on May 21. Most of the filming was done in Kraków, where the movie is set. Filming also took place in Nowa Huta (district of Kraków), Kalwaria Zebrzydowska and Dubie.

References

External links 
 
 Vinci on Filmweb 

2004 films
2000s crime comedy films
2000s heist films
Films about art forgery
Films directed by Juliusz Machulski
Films set in Kraków
Films set in the 2000s
Films shot in Kraków
Films shot in Warsaw
Museums in popular culture
Polish crime comedy films
2000s Polish-language films
2004 comedy films
Films set in museums